The Financial Management and Accountability Act 1997 is an Australian Government Act about the proper management of public money and property.
It is administered by the Department of Finance and Deregulation.

References
 Comlaw page
 Australian Government >> Department of Finance and Deregulation >> Financial Framework >> FMA Legislation >> FMA Act

Acts of the Parliament of Australia
1997 in Australian law